Adagadi  is a village in the southern state of Karnataka, India. It is located in the Shimoga taluk of Shimoga district in Karnataka.

See also
 Shimoga
 Districts of Karnataka

References

External links
 Shimoga District website

Villages in Shimoga district